Kris Abrams-Draine (born October 4, 2001) is an American football cornerback for the Missouri Tigers.

High school career
Abrams-Draine attended Spanish Fort High School in Spanish Fort, Alabama. He played wide receiver before switching to quarterback his senior year. As a senior, he passed for 723 yards, rushed for 1,745, and scored 30 total touchdowns. Abrams-Draine was originally committed to play college football at Louisiana State University (LSU) and the University of Mississippi before deciding on the University of Missouri.

College career
After playing in five games as a wide receiver his true freshman year at Missouri in 2020, Abrams-Draine switched to cornerback in 2021. That year he played in all 13 games with 10 starts and had 37 tackles and three interceptions. He returned to Missouri as a starter in 2022.

References

External links
Missouri Tigers bio

Living people
Players of American football from Alabama
American football cornerbacks
American football wide receivers
Missouri Tigers football players
2001 births